200 South Orange, formerly known as the SunTrust Center and Sun Bank Center, is a skyscraper located in the Central Business District of Orlando, Florida. Completed in 1988, it has 35 stories and 30 floors of usable office space. Originally named the Sun Bank Center, the name changed after SunTrust Banks began its series of mergers and acquisitions in the 1990s.

Details
Designed in contemporary postmodern style, the building has a beige and green color scheme accented in blue hues. There are 35 stories with 30 floors of usable office space. The tower has a six-level parking garage and its lobby is an eight-story atrium. The building is topped with four green pyramids and the upper five stories is actually one large floor that provides panoramic views of Orlando and the surrounding area. However, this floor is not open to the general public. A pre-existing skyscraper is integrated in the center's design. This original building, which was re-faced during the 1987-1988 construction of the main tower, was the original First National Bank at Orlando. This original building was built in 1958-1960. Later the building was renovated to suit SunTrust, the windows were changed individually instead of keeping the windows a stripe, and was the first of six branch banks of what would become Sun Bank, and then later SunTrust. The building name has changed from SunTrust Center to 200 South Orange due to the move out of the company. They are now located in The Church Street Plaza Tower built in late 2019 which has been renamed SunTrust Plaza.

The evening lighting scheme provides amber illumination on the four pyramids and white illumination on the upper floors. There is a restaurant on the ground level of the building. The tower is home to the consulates of Argentina and the trade offices of Qingdao, China.

Local architects speculate that the Federal Aviation Administration has imposed a height limit on buildings in Orlando, because the Orlando Executive Airport is located a few miles east of downtown and its flight path leads over the city center. As a result, 200 South Orange has remained the tallest building in Orlando since 1988.

In popular culture
The building is featured in both the book and film versions of Paper Towns, a novel by John Green. In the story, protagonist Quentin Jacobsen and Margo, his love interest, ascend the tower at night to take in the view of Orlando. During the scene Margo declares the city to be a "paper town."

References

Skyscraper office buildings in Orlando, Florida
Office buildings completed in 1988
Skidmore, Owings & Merrill buildings
1988 establishments in Florida
Buildings and structures in Orlando, Florida
Skyscrapers in Orlando, Florida